Peristodrilus is a genus of annelids belonging to the family Naididae.

The species of this genus are found in Europe.

Species:

Peristodrilus montanus

References

Annelids